Neogurelca masuriensis, the diffuse-banded hawkmoth, is a moth of the family Sphingidae. It is found from north-western India along the southern Himalaya of northern India.

The wingspan is 42–50 mm.

The larvae have been recorded feeding on Leptodermis lanceolata.

References

Neogurelca
Moths described in 1875